Silverio Blasi (17 November 1921 – 27 April 1995) was an Italian television and stage director, actor and screenwriter.

Born in Rome, Blasi was co-founder, together with  Giorgio De Lullo, Goliarda Sapienza and Mario Landi, of the avant-garge theater company "T. 45". After several collaborations with Anton Giulio Bragaglia, in 1954 Blasi started a long collaboration with RAI, for which he write and directed a large number of miniseries and television films.

Blasi was also an occasional film actor, mostly cast in character roles in art films.

References

External links 
 

1921 births
1995 deaths
Italian television directors
Italian male film actors
20th-century Italian screenwriters
Male actors from Rome
Film directors from Rome
Italian theatre directors
Italian male screenwriters
People of Lazian descent
20th-century Italian male writers